Beverly is a city in Lincoln County, Kansas, United States.  As of the 2020 census, the population of the city was 135.

History
Beverly was first settled in 1886, and it was incorporated as a city in 1904. The city was named after Beverly, West Virginia, the native home of a pioneer settler.

Geography
Beverly is located at  (39.014831, -97.974772).

Demographics

2010 census
As of the census of 2010, there were 162 people, 72 households, and 44 families residing in the city. The racial makeup of the city was 100.0% White. Hispanic or Latino of any race were 1.9% of the population.

There were 72 households, of which 27.8% had children under the age of 18 living with them, 41.7% were married couples living together, 12.5% had a female householder with no husband present, 6.9% had a male householder with no wife present, and 38.9% were non-families. 27.8% of all households were made up of individuals, and 13.9% had someone living alone who was 65 years of age or older. The average household size was 2.25 and the average family size was 2.64.

The median age in the city was 46.8 years. 19.1% of residents were under the age of 18; 7.5% were between the ages of 18 and 24; 20.4% were from 25 to 44; 36.4% were from 45 to 64; and 16.7% were 65 years of age or older. The gender makeup of the city was 45.1% male and 54.9% female.

2000 census
As of the census of 2000, there were 199 people, 73 households, and 55 families residing in the city. The racial makeup of the city was 93.47% White, 2.01% Native American, 0.50% from other races, and 4.02% from two or more races. Hispanic or Latino of any race were 2.01% of the population.

There were 73 households, out of which 27.4% had children under the age of 18 living with them, 64.4% were married couples living together, 8.2% had a female householder with no husband present, and 23.3% were non-families. 20.5% of all households were made up of individuals, and 8.2% had someone living alone who was 65 years of age or older. The average household size was 2.73 and the average family size was 3.05.

In the city, the population was spread out, with 32.7% under the age of 18, 5.0% from 18 to 24, 24.1% from 25 to 44, 22.6% from 45 to 64, and 15.6% who were 65 years of age or older. The median age was 36 years. For every 100 females, there were 84.3 males. For every 100 females age 18 and over, there were 97.1 males.

As of 2000 the median income for a household in the city was $21,750, and the median income for a family was $23,472. Males had a median income of $29,167 versus $23,333 for females. The per capita income for the city was $11,274. About 19.1% of families and 14.6% of the population were below the poverty line, including 7.7% of those under the age of eighteen and 12.9% of those 65 or over.

Education
The community is served by Lincoln USD 298 public school district.

Beverly schools were closed through school unification. The Beverly High School mascot was Bobcats.

Notable people
 Donald K. Ross, World War II Medal of Honor recipient was born in Beverly.

References

Further reading

External links
 Beverly - Directory of Public Officials
 Historic Images of Beverly, Wichita State University Library
 Beverly city map, KDOT

Cities in Kansas
Cities in Lincoln County, Kansas
1886 establishments in Kansas
Populated places established in 1886